Patti LaBelle is the debut solo album by American singer Patti LaBelle, released in 1977. The first album LaBelle recorded after sixteen years fronting the band Labelle (formerly Patti LaBelle and the Bluebelles), it is notable for the dance hit, "Joy to Have Your Love", the classic gospel-inspiring ballad, "You Are My Friend" and the Angelo "Funky Knuckles" Nocentelli mid-tempo number, "I Think About You".

Background and release
Prior to recording the album, LaBelle initially thought of retiring from the music industry after nearly twenty years as the lead singer of the hugely successful girl group Labelle. Following the group's March 1977 split, brought on by months of growing tension, LaBelle and her husband of then eight years, Armstead Edwards, went to see a shrink over emotional distress in their marriage, which was partially due to the singer's fright over continuing a career without her group members. After further evaluation, LaBelle and her husband sorted out their differences. Edwards was then hired by his wife to be her manager as she carefully plotted her solo career. The singer traveled to New Orleans to record her new album, with David Rubinson, producer of Labelle's final album prior to their initial breakup, Chameleon, and also famed for his work with The Pointer Sisters.

Signing a solo contract with Epic Records, Labelle's former label, the singer released her debut album in October 1977. While the debuting single, "Joy to Have Your Love", became a minor R&B hit, and the dance number, "Dan Swit Me", was popular on the dance club circuit, the album's most notable song was a ballad co-composed by LaBelle, Edwards and LaBelle's musical director, James "Budd" Ellison, initially dedicated to LaBelle's and Edwards' only biological son, Zuri (who is now LaBelle's manager), titled "You Are My Friend". While the song only scaled the high sixties on the US Billboard R&B chart, it soon became one of her famous show-stoppers while performing the song. LaBelle performed the song at her first solo concert in London, getting a standing ovation, which helped to give LaBelle motivation to continue her career. The album, when released, performed successfully, reaching number 62 on the US Billboard 200 and number 31 on the R&B albums chart, while critics hailed the album.

Track listing
"Joy to Have Your Love" (Jeffrey E. Cohen, Ray Parker Jr., James Budd Ellison) - 5:44
"Funky Music" (Barrett Strong, Norman Whitfield) - 6:24
"Since I Don't Have You" (Wally Lester, Joe VerScharen, Joseph Rock, James Beaumont, Jackie Taylor) - 5:40
"Dan Swit Me" (Jeffrey E. Cohen, Ray Parker, Jr., David Rubinson, Armstead Edwards) - 5:50
"You Are My Friend" (Patti LaBelle, Budd Ellison, Armstead Edwards) - 4:36
"You Can't Judge a Book by the Cover" (Willie Dixon) - 4:22
"I Think About You" (Leo Nocentelli) - 4:30
"Do I Stand a Chance?" (Patti LaBelle, James Budd Ellison, Armstead Edwards) - 4:21
"Most Likely You Go Your Way (And I'll Go Mine)" (Bob Dylan) - 6:44

2011 Remaster
10. "Joy to Have Your Love" (Single Version) - 3:15
11. "Dan Swit Me" (Single Version) - 3:59

Personnel 
 Patti LaBelle – lead vocals, backing vocals, vocal arrangements 
 James Budd Ellison – keyboards, musical direction 
 Leo Nocentelli – acoustic piano (7), guitars 
 Ray Parker Jr. – guitars, bass, additional backing vocals (5)
 Mac Cridlin – bass
 George Porter Jr. – bass
 David Shields – bass (2)
 James Gadson – drums, additional backing vocals (5)
 Natcho – harmonica
 David Rubinson – arrangements, vocal arrangements  
 Cecil Womack – backing vocals 
 Curtis Womack – backing vocals 
 Friendly Womack, Jr. – backing vocals 
 The Waters Family [Julia, Luther, Maxine and Oren Waters] – backing vocals 
 Sherri Barman – additional backing vocals (5)
 Rosie Casals – additional backing vocals (5)
 Yvonne Fair – additional backing vocals (5)
 Norma Harris  – additional backing vocals (5)

Brass Section
 Kurt McGettrick – brass arrangements (1, 3-5, 7, 8), saxophones (1, 3-5, 7, 8)
 Gary Herbig – saxophones and woodwinds (1, 3, 5, 7, 8)
 John Phillips – woodwinds (1, 3-5, 7, 8)
 Bill Napier – clarinet (4)
 Attilio DePalma – French horn (1, 3, 5, 7, 8)
 Sidney Muldrow – French horn (1, 3, 5, 7, 8)
 Lew McCreary – trombone (1, 3, 5, 7, 8)
 Gordon Messick – trombone (4)
 Oscar Brashear – trumpet (1, 3, 5, 7, 8)
 Gary Grant – trumpet (1, 3, 5, 7, 8)
 Zane Woodworth – trumpet (4)
 Jim Self – tuba (1, 3, 5, 7, 8)

String Section
 Robert Manchurian and Dale Warren – orchestral arrangements and conductor
 Nathan Rubin – concertmaster 
 Teresa Adams – string contractor 
 Ellen Dessler, Thomas Elliot, Nancy Ellis, Ruth Freeman, Stephen Gehl, Theresa Madden, Mary Anne Meredith, Mischa Myers, Carl Pederson, Kazi Pitelka, Melinda Ross, Terri Sternberg, John Tenney and Emily Van Valkenburgh – string players

Production 
 David Rubinson – producer, engineer 
 Jeffrey E. Cohen – associate producer 
 Fred Catero – engineer
 Terry Becker – assistant engineer 
 Chris Minto – assistant engineer 
 George Horn – mastering
 Paul Bevoir – logo design 
 Collin Elliot – logo design

Charts

References

Album chart usages for BillboardRandBHipHop
Album chart usages for Billboard200
1977 debut albums
Patti LaBelle albums
Albums produced by Dave Rubinson
Epic Records albums